Pinar del Río dominated the 1996–97 Cuban National Series, posting the league's best regular season record. In the playoffs, the Vegueros, led by Omar Linares, went undefeated, sweeping both best-of-seven series.

Standings

Group A

Group B

Group C

Group D

Playoffs

References

 (Note - text is printed in a white font on a white background, depending on browser used.)

Cuban National Series seasons
Base
Base
Cuba
1996 in baseball